Samuel Onyuku Elenwo (7 December 1933 – 2008) was the Anglican Bishop of Niger Delta in Niger Delta Province of the Church of Nigeria.

Elenwo was born on 7 December 1933 in Okporowo-Ogbakiri, where he went to primary school, followed by Okporowo-Ogbakiri Central School,  Kalabari National College, and thence to New Bethel College, Onitsha.

He was consecrated as the fourth Bishop of Niger Delta on 1 March  1981 by Timothy Olufosoye, the first archbishop of the province, at the Cathedral Church of St. James Oke-Bola, Ibadan. He became the first bishop of the newly created Anglican Diocese of Niger Delta North on 16 May 1996, a tenure he held until his retirement in December 1999.

He died in 2008.

Early life

Samuel Onyuku Elenwo, the first son of Chief Edward Onyuke Elenwo and Madam Omekele Elenwo of Okporowo-Ogbakiri in Rivers State, Nigeria, was born on 7 December 1933. His father, Chief Edward, was one of the founding fathers of Christianity in his hometown and a leader in his church, St. Paul’s Anglican Church, Okporowo-Ogbakiri. Samuel, who lost his mother at a very tender age, was brought up by his grandmother, Madam Nwereoma Onyuku Elenwo.

Young Samuel grew up like his mates, working and playing with them as brothers at home and in school. He loved to play table tennis, dress well and dance vivaciously to indigenous music. His parents introduced him to their trading occupation because they lived and worked with Kalabari neighbors. It was through this exposure that Samuel learned the Kalabari language which he spoke fluently.

Education and early career

Young Samuel grew up like his mates, working and playing with them as brothers at home and in school. He loved to play table tennis, dress well and dance vivaciously to indigenous music. His parents introduced him to their trading occupation because they lived and worked with Kalabari neighbors. It was through this exposure that Samuel learned the Kalabari language which he spoke fluently.

Samuel began his educational career at the famous Ogbakiri Central School (OCS), Okporowo Ogbakiri. Sam also attended St.Peter’s School, Isiokpo, briefly before up at O.C.S with standard six Certificate.

From there he went on to Kalabari National College, and then to New Bethel College, Onitsha and from there he proceeded to Dennis Memorial Grammar School also in Onitsha, where he passed his O and A levels.

Sam’s devotion as a student attracted the attention of Bishop Fubara who, like a father became very much attached to Sam and encouraged him so much. Sam became very very active in the church. He became one of the leaders in the choir and helped to organize the choristers. He sang the tenor part.

Sam went further to study Theology at Immanuel college, Ibadan where he was awarded the London diploma in Theology in 1956.

From 1966-1973, Sam’s quest for educational excellence took him to three universities.

 University of Ibadan where he got a diploma in Religious Studies in 1968,
 University of Ife (now Obafemi Awolowo Univery, Ile ife) where he obtained a certificate in philosophy and Logic,
 University of Nigeria, Nsukka where he obtained Bachelor of Arts in Religious Studies and Education.

Sam also had the privilege to attend various conferences both locally and internationally, which to be further avenues for knowledge.

Early career

Sam’s journey into his secular carrier began when he was appointed a teacher and posted to St.Matthew’s school, Igbo-Etchie.

From Igbo – Etchie, Sam left for Holy Trinity School, Rumuapara. From Rumuapara, Sam processed to the Native Administration (NA) school, Ibaa. At Ibbaa, Sam who was now both physically and psychologically more mature, made his mark as a distinguished teacher.

Sam also worked with the Electricity Corporation of Nigeria, Lagos as well as Government Comprehensive College Borikiri.

In 1980, Sam joined the Rivers State Broadcasting Corporation as Head of Religious department and Radio Pastor.

Family life

Sam was actively involved in the work of the ministry, but that didn’t in any way stop him from having time for his family and raising godly children.

Sam married Chineye Elenwo (née Awuse).

Also from Okporowo – Ogbakiri in Emohua Local Government Area of Rivers State.

Chinyere Elenwo served in the Rivers State Teaching service Commission as a teacher before gaining admission into the Rivers State College of Education, Rumuolumeni as an NCE student.

She holds both bachelor’s and Master’s Degrees in Education respectively from the University of Hull, England which she completed in record time.

Sam’s wife contributed immensely to sustain Sam in his assignment. In fact, she was at home with the husband's vocation.

Sam and his wife were blessed with the following children;

Prof. Elizabeth Elenwo

Prof. Elizabeth Elenwo. is the Dean of the Graduate School of Behavior Sciences and a professor in the behavioral science program at Southern California Seminary (SCS).

She also currently works at San Diego Christian College (SDCC) as assistant professor and at Pastoral Care facilitating domestic violence groups in SD. Prior to working at SCS Elizabeth was the deputy director of the Phoenix House in San Diego. Elizabeth was born in Nigeria, and has lived in Scotland and England, where she did her early Undergraduate and Postgraduate studies.

Josephine Elenwo – Director, Rivers State Hospital Management Board.

Mrs. Ann Nzekwe – Reading Instructional Specialist/ Doctoral student.

She is a reading instructional Specialist/Doctorial student.

Mrs. Joy Elenwo – Ofordu – Electronic Medical Record Consultant / Doctoral Student.

Victoria Elenwo – Graduate of Communication/Law Degree.

Rev. Samuel Elenwo (Jnr) (RIP) – Graduate of Banking and Finance and Reverend.

Henry Elenwo (RIP) – School of International Business studies.

Gloria Etang – Chief Nursing officer, Rivers State Hospital Management Board.

Entry into the ministry

Sam was ordained a Deacon of the Anglican Communion on 23 December 1956. People wondered why he decided to tread a Terrain which did not offer any attraction and was regarded as the most unprofitable in terms of human estimation. They felt he wasn’t doing badly in his job as a clerk in the electricity Corporation of Nigeria (ECN) where he was working.

Despite the mixed feelings from friends and some relatives concerning his ordination, the reaction from Sam’s parents and relations back at home was quite encouraging. According to Sam:

"My parents and relatives were quite delighted, more so with the fact that the Anglican Church of that time had only Agents and Catechists. So I was to be first indigenous priest from my place"

Through the encouragement and sponsorship of the Bishop Tugwell Memorial Church Lagos, Sam went in to Emmanuel College of Theology, Ibadan for his Ministerial training after having resigned his appointment with the Electricity Corporation of Nigeria.

Sam was ordained a priest on 22 Dec 1957 by the Late Bishop A.W Howells (jnr) in Lagos.

After his diaconate ordination in 1956, he was attached to the Cathedral Church of Christ Marina Lagos where he was given proper foundation by the Late Bishop A.W Howells, the then Bishop of Lagos.

He was appointed Honorary Canon of at Stephen Cathedral Bonny in 1978 by Bishop Y.A Fubara (JP). Sam was further appointed Bishops Examining Chaplain by Bishop Fubara on 19 July 1977.

From 1979 to 1980, Sam served as the chaplain to the University of Port Harcourt as well as chaplain to all secondary schools in Port Harcourt.

He also assisted the Venerable O.D.C Brown (Late) in St.Cyprain’s church, Port Harcourt. Sam’s tenure as Assistant Priest in st Cyprian’s church was quite remarkable.

Election, consecration and enthronement

Sam’s ascension to the exalted throne of Bishop was described as "miraculous" by Sam. This is because there were some senior and higher ranking clergymen who were highly favoured to succeed Bishop Fubara. Sam once said "it’s by the special grace of God that I was elected to succeed my spiritual father (Bishop Fubara). You see, at that time there were other colleagues senior to me in rank and status in the Diocese. In fact, I never dreamt of such opportunity in Life."

It is instructive to say a little about the circumstances that led to the return of Sam from Lagos to Port Harcourt, which eventually culminated in his becoming a Bishop.

Ven.Chukwuigwe said this; "The Bishop Y.A. Fubara and myself visited Lagos for a meeting. We met with a bright young clergyman who hails from Rivers State of Nigeria. We had heard of him before we went to Lagos. We tried to induce him to return home and take appointment with the Niger Delta Diocese. The next time we visited Lagos we went to his station and resumed our talk with him about his coming home to up appointment (with Niger Delta Diocese). Within a short period after our last talk with him he took up appointment with the Rivers State Government as one of the Civil servants (Commissioners). The then Bishop of Owerri and later first Archbishop of province Two, the most Rev. Dr. B.C. Nwankiti, also played a key role in Sam’s return from Lagos."

The process of Sam’s election began on 2 May 1980 when the retiring Bishop of Diocese, Rt. Rev. Y.A. Fubara (of blessed memory) wrote Sam, who was then a Reverend Canon, requesting them to supply his biodata.

On 7 May 1980, Sam responded to Bishop Fubara’s letter with much reluctancy since the motive was not clear to him.

Sam said; "initially, I was hesitant in responding to my Bishop’s request because I had thought that as a carrier Civil servant, my spiritual father wanted my resume to canvass for me for a political appointment. But on my second thought, I gave up this idea as a refusal on my part would tantamount to canonical disobedience."

As it is customary, the election was concealed until 15 January 1981, when Bishop Fubara Visited Sam to deliver a letter from primate, Most Rev. T.O Olufosoye, which approved the election of Sam by the Episcopal Synod, as the Bishop of Niger Delta Diocese; and went ahead to congratulate Sam on his Successful election.

Sam was consecrated in a service which took place at the Cathedral Church of Saint James, Ibadan on Sunday 1 March 1981. Two other Bishops were consecrated alongside Sam that day in the church. The two Bishops were; Rt.Rev.Gideon Isaac Olajide, (former Bishop of Ilesa and now Bishop of Ibadan) and Rt.Rev. Samuel Olufumilade Aderin,( retired Bishop of Ondo)

Sam had the privilege of being enthroned as a diocesan of two Dioceses during his Episcopacy which covered a period of about Bonny nineteen years. First, on 8 March 1981, at St. Stephen’s Cathedral, Bonny (the second oldest Cathedral Church in the whole of West Africa Region, after St. David’s Freetown, Sierra Leonel), he was enthroned as the 4th Bishop of Niger Delta Diocese.

Second, as the first Diocesan of the Niger Delta North by translation, when on Thursday, 16 May 1996 (Ascension Day), on the mandate of his Grace, The Most Rev. J.A. Adetiloye, the Primate and Metropolitan of all Nigeria, he was enthroned at the Cathedral Church of St. Paul, Diobu, Port Harcourt.

Niger Delta Diocese

In the early days of Sam’s Tenure as the Bishop of Niger Delta Diocese, Sam was quoted to have said the following;

"My dream and ambition for my Diocese is to be renewed with faith and believe in things of the Spirit against the things of the physical so that I will have spiritual as well as material growth."

Sam laid more emphasis on the spiritual rejuvenation of his members while at the same time ensuring that the physical condition of the Diocese was improved in line with his Decentralization policy. The result was the marked and tremendous growth (Spiritually, numerically and physically) of the Niger Delta Diocese.

Barely two months after his Enthronement, Sam was to carry out his first assignment as a Bishop; he presided over the meeting of the 3rd Session of the 10th Synod of the Diocese, which held at St. Peter’s Church, Okrika, 20 to 29 April 1981 with the theme,"faith, Hope and Love". Details of the Synod is contained in the book "Omoluabi A man of good Character" Click here to Purchase the book.

Three new Diocese were created out of the Niger Delta Diocese during the Episcopacy of Sam. These are;

 The Calabar Diocese; Which was created inaugurated on 20 December 1990
 The Uyo Diocese; Which was inaugurated on 27 November 1992. and
 The Niger Delta North; Which was inaugurated on 16 May 1996. Sam sees this as one of his greatest achievements. He was quoted to have said "the greatest challenge of my Diocese is the successful creation of two missionary Dioceses of Calabar and Uyo and one full fledged Diocese (Niger Delta North), from the Niger Delta Diocese. It was indeed a worthwhile achievement after so many years.

From just a two Archdeaconry (Bonny and Port Harcourt) passed on to him and his progeny, the good Lord used Sam to expand and sustain the church of the Niger Delta for more than 15years (March 1981 to May 1996).

As at the time Sam left the Diocese, there existed 17 Arcdeaconries namely;

*Bonny,

*Port Harcourt,

*Okrika,

*Calabar,

*Yenegoua,

*Etchie,

*Ahoada,

*Ikwerre,

*Ogoni,

*Evo,

*Kalabari

*North,

*Kaiama,

*Andoni,

*Ikwerre South,

*Eleme,

*Brass and

*Opobo.

However, Port Harcourt, Ahoada, Ikwerre, Ogoni, Evo, Ikwerre South and Eleme have metamorphosed into the new Diocese of Niger Delta North.

There was also a sharp increase in the number of districts and Parishes by the time Sam completed his Episcopacy. The number rose from 43 that existed upon his assumption of duties to a total of 147. Many new Churches were also planted.

Moreso, the problem of insufficient clergy in Diocese was also tackled by Sam. A total of 234 priests including the Bishop were in service as against 63during the Tenure of Sam in 1981.

Sam also formed the council of Laity, with the primary aim of encouraging and promoting evangelism. The inauguration of this council took place on 11 August 1992 at St. Cyprian’s Church, Port Harcourt. They served the church in various ways. They served as parish Treasurers, Wardens, Stewards, and Ushers, Sunday school teachers, children service leaders, Organists, Choir Masters and sextons.

He undertook aggressive evangelism both in urban and rural areas. As a result, many became committed, born again Christians in the Niger Delta Diocese. He established the Bishop Crowther Memorial Secondary School in Port Harcourt.

Elenwo made regular pastoral visits throughout the vast Niger Delta Diocese, in spite of the difficult terrain and the rough seas and rivers. During such visits, he confirmed thousands of people, inaugurated parishes, created new archdeaconries, laid the foundation stones of new churches and dedicated completed ones.

The bishopric of Samuel Elenwo invigorated the Great Anglican Revival team, producing dynamic evangelistic Bible teachers and rigorous revival programs which led to church planting in many districts. They held evangelistic awareness conferences and seminars placing the emphasis on the importance of the Word of God as the true foundation for the Christian church. He encouraged every church in his diocese to be evangelistic.

To solve the financial issues that faced the Diocese at the time, Sam substituted the committee on financial instructions under the Chairmanship of Venerable S.S.S Not. With the recommendations of this committee, especially on financial management, the treasury of the Diocese became buoyant and the Diocese was also free of debt to any external bodies.

Elenwo devised fundraising strategies for the diocese which included joint ventures with the CSS Bookshop, belonging to the Anglican Church, introduced the payment of tithes by church members, ruled that burial dates of dead relatives should be no more than fourteen days after death (to reduce the expense of holding corpses in the mortuary for long periods and the very elaborate burial parties afterwards), and other noble ideas.

References 

 Joy Elenwo Ofordu (2018) Omoluabi a man of good Character: Gospel Warehouse, Port Harcourt.
 Life and Times of Bishop Elenwo, Samuel Onyuku. Part 5. www.earthsoundreports.com Retrieved 2021-06-2021.
 Life and Times of Bishop Elenwo, Samuel Onyuku. Part 4. www.earthsoundreports.com Retrieved 2021-06-2021.
 Life and Times of Bishop Elenwo, Samuel Onyuku. Part 3. www.earthsoundreports.com Retrieved 2021-06-2021.
 Life and Times of Bishop Elenwo, Samuel Onyuku. Part 2. www.earthsoundreports.com Retrieved 2021-06-2021.
 Life and Times of Bishop Elenwo, Samuel Onyuku. Part 1 Published on www.earthsoundreports.com under the supervision of Joy Elenwo.

Anglican bishops of Niger Delta
Anglican bishops of Niger Delta North
20th-century Anglican bishops in Nigeria
Nigerian Anglicans
People from Onitsha
1933 births
2008 deaths